Settimo Milanese is a comune (municipality) in the Province of Milan in the Lombardy region of Italy.

The industrial district of Castelletto is home to Italtel and STMicroelectronics.

Settimo Milanese borders Rho, Milan, Cornaredo, and Cusago.

Toponymy 
It's believed that the name comes from the distance between Settimo and Milan: it is in fact located near the seventh milestone of the road from Milan to Novara. The epythet "Milanese" was added after the Unità d'Italia to distinguish it from other towns with the same name.

References

External links
 Official website

Cities and towns in Lombardy